Deadtime Stories is a 2010 hidden object PC game developed by I-play and distributed by Big Fish Games. The premise of the game centers around a mysterious character known as Edward Blackgate, and the lost souls interred in his private cemetery, "Everlasting Life". The player meets these lost souls and learns about the events that lead to their downfalls, respectively.

Jessie Bodeen
Miss Jessie Bodeen is characterized as a New Orleans Voodoo queen, who acts as a healer for the local African Americans working as servants in the city. As a healer, she has pledged to do no harm. Now a resident at "Everlasting Life", Jessie tells the story of her downfall when she accepts a commission from Delphine LaLaurie, a character based on her real-life counterpart. For $150, this character was to drive away another socialite, Mrs. Anton, a wealthy young widow, who is new in town and already more popular than Delphine LaLaurie. For the next three months, Jessie is able to discreetly poison Mrs. Anton with small, non-lethal amounts of aconite to keep her too ill to attend any parties, having been warned against invoking the Loa to curse Mrs. Anton by Mambo Marie, a fellow Voodoo practitioner. However, after three months and the end of the social season in New Orleans, Delphine LaLaurie reneges on their deal, despite Jessie Bodeen upholding her part of the bargain. Furious about having been lied to, Jessie Bodeen makes up her mind to seek revenge on Delphine LaLaurie by invoking the Loa, particularly Damballa, to avenge her. The Loa punishes Delphine LaLaurie, regardless of collateral damages and innocent bystanders. Ten years later, the Loa also punished Jessie Bodeen for having taken on Delphine LaLaurie's commission in the first place.

External links
 Deadtime Stories, on Big Fish Games
 Deadtime Stories Walkthrough, on Big Fish Games 
 Deadtime Stories, on I-play

2010 video games
Big Fish Games games
Casual games
Hidden object games
Video game franchises
Video games developed in the United States
Windows games
Windows-only games
Single-player video games
Fiction about Louisiana Voodoo
Video games set in cemeteries
Video games set in New Orleans
I-play games